Arturo Iacona (born 25 November 1957) is a former Italian male long-distance runner who competed at three edition of the IAAF World Cross Country Championships at senior level (1977, 1978, 1981),

References

External links
 Arturo Iacona profile at Association of Road Racing Statisticians

1957 births
Living people
Italian male long-distance runners
Italian male cross country runners